The ugly stick is a traditional Newfoundland musical instrument fashioned out of household and tool shed items, typically a mop handle with bottle caps, tin cans, small bells and other noise makers. The instrument is played with a drum stick or notched stick and has a distinctive sound.

History
In outports and remote villages, social gatherings such as concerts, "times," mummering, and kitchen parties were an important part of the rural culture. The principal melody instruments were accordions and fiddles. Starting in the 20th century, rhythmic accompaniment came from the ugly stick. The instrument's early history is vague, but there are clear precursors:

While often described as a "traditional" Newfoundland instrument, the ugly stick likely only became familiar to Newfoundland and Labrador audiences in the early 1980s. The Newfoundland and Labrador Folk Festival Guide for 1987 featured an ugly stick player on the cover. The guide noted the instrument was "Not available in any music store" and included the following explanation:

 

Winston Stanley may have been one of the first local musicians to popularize the ugly stick, making his own in the late 1970s,  while Buddy Wasisname and the Other Fellers acquired their first one in Charlottetown, Prince Edward Island, in 1983. As late as 1988, an article about a local folk club deemed it necessary to describe what an ugly stick was, stating:

By the 1990s, references to ugly sticks start to appear in local publications. The instrument was likely given a boost by its use by the Folk of the Sea Choir, a fisher choir that formed after the cod moratorium in 1992. At the Choir's first concert in 1994, it was introduced by the Dunne Brothers, Rick and Doug, from Renews, accompanied by Gerard Hamilton. Doug explained his instrument to the audience:

Also during the 1990s, ugly sticks became widely available in local music and gift stores, crafted by makers such as Grenfell Letto. Originally from the Labrador Straits, Letto started making mini ugly sticks that tourists could take home more readily than the larger version. In 2012, he was reported as making around 150 large ugly sticks and between 200 and 300 of his mini ugly sticks per year for the tourist market.

The name ugly stick was not universal even into the 2000s. In 2007, folklorists Maureen Power and Evelyn Osborne documented the playing of a "silly stick" by Melvin Combden, Seldom-Come-By, Fogo Island. 

In the early 2000s, communities started to organize ugly stick making workshops. One early community-organized workshop was held in Trepassey, as part of a Come Home Year celebration. Yvonne Fontaine was the then Coordinator for the Southern Avalon Development Association:

The Mummers Festival, established in 2009, regularly includes ugly stick making workshops, often featuring Trepassey-based maker Wayne Cave. Founding festival director Ryan Davis noted in 2014,

The Festival expanded its workshop program outside of St. John's, including a workshop in Portugal Cove-St. Philips where the sticks were made mostly by families with young children. A workshop on making ugly sticks was included as part of The International Council for Traditional Music World Conference, held in St. John's in 2011, and workshops have been organized independently in communities such as Summerside and Bauline, which held an "Ugly Stick Clinic" in 2018.

Expats and travelling musicians have spread the use of ugly sticks across Canada and internationally. Traditions continued to evolve in the 2000s: a 2000 wedding in Pembroke, Ontario with a "Nova Scotia born Newfoundlander" bride involved an ugly stick:

In 2015, the Terre-Neuve Newfoundlanders & Friends Association organized an ugly stick contest during the Newfie Days Festival in Lunenburg, Nova Scotia. In 2016, a children's book by Joshua Goudie on ugly sticks was published to emphasize Newfoundland and Labrador's musical culture.

Construction
The instrument's main body is a mop or broom handle, sometimes cut to a desired length. Often, an old rubber boot is attached to the bottom and a tin can acting as a cymbal is attached at the very top. At strategic intervals along the length of the shaft, nails or screws affixed with bottle caps, felt tins, and other noisemakers are nailed into the shaft. The instrument is then decorated with items of colour and fluff to the artist's taste to create an instrument unique to the maker. Art educator Jason Sellers noted in 2008:The stick must be chosen wisely. Remember: your creation can be simple or complicated, but either way it will be eccentric. To acquire enough bottle caps for one ugly stick, you’ll need to preplan at least two long weekends before your first big gig. A couple dozen will do, but the more bling you collect, the louder and uglier your stick will be. Go out back to the tool shed (just like Pop would do) and dig out all that jingles and clangs. If you can stick a nail through it, and it makes noise, it will work great on an ugly stick.The instrument has been described as a testament "to the creativity of Newfoundlanders to make something inventive out of what would normally be thrown into the garbage."

Playing
The ugly stick is held in one hand part of the way up the shaft and the musician would hold a drum stick in the other. The instrument would be lifted and dropped on the floor in a rhythmic fashion while the musician would strike the attachments and cymbal to embellish the sound.

Idiomatic usage
"Beaten with an ugly stick" and its grammatical forms ("[It] looks like someone beat [direct object] with an ugly stick," etc.) are an American English idiom used in reference to someone or something that looks ugly or unappealing, and are unrelated to the musical instrument.

See also
Boomba
Folk music
List of Newfoundland songs
List of people of Newfoundland and Labrador
Monkey stick
Music of Newfoundland and Labrador

References

External links

Traditional music and instruments by Heritage Newfoundland
A sample picture
“Freedom Boot” by The Groanbox Boys.
Ugly Stick used in the musical "Come From Away"

Canadian musical instruments
Newfoundland and Labrador music
Idiophones
Improvised musical instruments
Culture_of_Newfoundland_and_Labrador